In 2010 elections were held in Sri Lankan Tamil diaspora communities to elect members to the first Transnational Constituent Assembly of Tamil Eelam.

Background
One of the main recommendations of the Advisory Committee on the Formation of a Provisional Transnational Government of Tamil Eelam was that a Transnational Constituent Assembly be formed consisting of 135 members. Of these, 115 would be elected and the remaining 20 shall consist of delegates selected by the elected assembly to represent regions where elections aren't feasible.

The distribution of the 115 elected representatives is: Australia 10; Benelux 3; Canada 25; Denmark 3; Finland 1; France 10; Germany 10; Ireland 1; Italy 3; New Zealand 2; Norway 3; South Africa 3; Sweden 1; Switzerland 10; UK 20; and USA 10.

The distribution of the 20 appointed delegates is: Caribbean & South America 1; India 5; Malaysia 3; Mauritius 1; Middle East 2; Oceania 1; Rest of Africa 1; Rest of Asia 1; Rest of Europe 1; Singapore 2; and South Africa 2.

Working groups were established in countries with significant diaspora communities to organise elections.

Results

Australia
Election is due to held on 22 May 2010 to elect four members in one constituency (NSW). Five members from three constituencies have already been elected unopposed:

Constituency 1 (New South Wales)

Constituency 2 (Victoria)

Constituency 4 (Australian Capital Territory, Tasmania)

Constituency 5 (Northern Territory, South Australia, Western Australia)

Canada
Election was held on 2 May 2010 in Canada to elect 25 members across five districts:

District 1 (Toronto GTA & Vicinities)

District 2 (Eastern Ontario)

District 3 (Western Ontario)

District 4 (Quebec & Eastern Canada)

District 5 (Western Canada)

Denmark
Election was held on 2 May 2010 in Denmark to elect three members:

France
Election was held on 2 May 2010 in France to elect 10 members across eight constituencies:

Constituency 1 (Electoral District 75)

Constituency 2 (Electoral District 93)

Constituency 3 (Electoral Districts 78 & 95)

Constituency 4 (Electoral District 94)

Constituency 5 (Electoral District 92)

Constituency 6 (Electoral Districts 77 & 91)

Constituency 7 (Northern France)

Constituency 8 (Southern France)

Germany
Election was held on 2 May 2010 in Germany to elect one member in one constituency: Election is due to held on 16 May 2010 to elect seven members in two constituencies.

Constituency 1 (Berlin, Brandenburg, Mecklenburg-Vorpommern, Sachsen-Anhalt, Sachsen, Thüringen)

Constituency 2 (Bremen, Hamburg, Niedersachsen, Schleswig-Holstein)

Constituency 3 (Nordrhein-Westfalen)

Constituency 4 (Baden-Württemberg, Bayern, Hessen, Rheinland-Pfalz, Saarland)

New Zealand
Two members across two electorates were elected unopposed:

Electorate 1 (Northern - Auckland)

Electorate 2 (Southern - Wellington)

Norway
Election was held on 2 May 2010 across 17 centres in Norway to elect three members on a nationwide constituency:

Switzerland
Election was held on 2 May 2010 in Switzerland to elect 10 members across seven constituencies:

Constituency 1 (Bern, Solothurn)

Constituency 2 (Zurich, Schaffhausen, Thurgau)

Constituency 3 (Basel, Aargau, Jura)

Constituency 4 (Luzern, Zug, Nidwalden, Uri, Obwalden, Schwyz)

Constituency 5 (Vaud, Valais, Genève, Fribourg, Neuchâtel)

Constituency 6 (Graubünden, Glarus, St. Gallen)

Constituency 7 (Tessin, Ticino)

United Kingdom
Election was held on 2 May 2010 in the United Kingdom to elect 20 members across five constituencies:

Constituency 1 (North East London)

Constituency 2 (South East London)

Constituency 3 (South West London)

Constituency 4 (North West London)

Constituency 5 (Outside London)

United States
Elections were held on 2 May 2010 in the United States to elect 10 members across nine regions, though eight regions were uncontested:

Region 1 (New England)

Region 2 (New York)

Region 3 (New Jersey)

Region 4 (Mid Atlantic)

Region 5 (South)

Region 6 (Mid West)

Region 7 (North West)

Region 8 (South West)

Region 9 (National)

See also
 Tamil Eelam independence referendums, 2009-2010
 Vaddukoddai Resolution

References

2010 elections in Europe
2010 elections in North America
2010 elections in Oceania
Transnational Government of Tamil Eelam